Sir James Thynne (1605 – 12 October 1670) was an English landowner and politician who sat in the House of Commons in two periods between 1640 and 1670.

Life
Thynne was born in 1605, the eldest son of Maria and Sir Thomas Thynne, of Longleat, Wiltshire. His parents' marriage and his legitimacy were the basis of a long legal dispute. He was knighted at Berwick on 23 June 1639.

In November 1640, Thynne was elected Member of Parliament for Wiltshire in the Long Parliament. He was disabled from sitting in 1642.

In 1655, Thynne founded an almshouse at Longbridge Deverill. Following the Restoration, he was High Sheriff of Wiltshire in 1661. Sir Christopher Wren advised him on improvements to the house at Longleat which included the great stairs and stone terrace. In 1664 he was re-elected MP for Wiltshire in the Cavalier Parliament and sat until his death in 1670.

Thynne married Lady Isabella Rich, daughter of Henry Rich, 1st Earl of Holland and his wife Isabel Cope. He died without issue and his nephew Thomas succeeded to the estates.

References

1605 births
1670 deaths
James
English landowners
High Sheriffs of Wiltshire
Members of the Parliament of England (pre-1707) for Wiltshire
English MPs 1640–1648
English MPs 1661–1679